The Renault Zoe (stylized as ZOE and pronounced as "Zoey"), known as Renault Zoe E-Tech Electric since 2021, is a five-door supermini electric car produced by the French manufacturer Renault. Renault originally unveiled, under the Zoe name, a number of different concept cars. Initially in 2005 as the Zoe City Car and later as the Zoe Z.E. electric concept was shown in two different versions in 2009 and 2010 under the Renault Z.E. name. A production ready version of the Zoe was shown at the 2012 Geneva Motor Show.

Retail customer deliveries began in France in December 2012, followed in 2013 by several European countries. Since 2013, the Zoe has been the all-time top selling all-electric car in the French market, with more than 100,000 units registered through June 2020. The Zoe was the top selling all-electric car in Europe for two years running, 2015 and 2016, and also topped European sales in the broader plug-in electric car segment in 2016 and 2020. As of 2020, the Zoe ranks as Europe's all-time best selling plug-in electric car. , global sales totaled almost 285,000 units since inception.

In September 2016, Renault announced the introduction of new higher range model with a 41 kWh lithium-ion battery, increasing the range to  under the NEDC cycle. In mid 2019, the ZE 50 R135 was announced, with a 55 kWh battery pack (52 usable) and  motor, and CCS charging; the final production-ready model was shown at the Frankfurt Motor Show and deliveries started in January 2020.

Concepts

Zoe City Car Concept (2005) 
The Renault Zoe City Car concept (or Z17) was shown at the 2005 Geneva Motor Show featuring 3 seats, the 3.45 m long open top vehicle was proposed as an urban focused car. This Zoe had no connection with the later electric Zoe concept to follow four years later.

Zoe Concept (2009) 
The Renault Zoe Concept was shown to the public in 2009 at the Frankfurt Motor Show to show the company's vision for a Clio sized electric car. It was powered by a  electric motor (mounted at the front) and lithium-ion batteries (under the seats). A third innovative option was to swap the batteries for a new pack at a Renault Quickdrop centre. The vehicle was designed by Raphaël Linari.

The design was tear-drop shaped featuring a see-through roof features solar panels which run the air-conditioning system and gull-wing doors. A new climate control system was also shown, developed with L'Oréal, which could spray essential oils into the interior to cut out harmful exterior smells, or rehydrate the interior to prevent skin drying out.

Zoe Preview (2010) 
The Zoe Preview, a substantially revised version of the Zoe concept, was shown to the public at the 2010 Paris Motor Show, and was claimed to be a near-definitive representation (90% showroom ready) of the final version of the car. Many of the existing design features of the 2009 concept model were discarded such as the gull-wing doors.

It was suggested that the Zoe ZE would be priced from €15,000.

Zoe E-Sport (2017) 
The Zoe E-sport is a hot hatch electric car concept unveiled at the 2017 Geneva Motor Show. It has an all-wheel drive design with two electric motors, each one powering an axle. The lithium-ion battery package weighs  and is on the rear. The car, weighing , has a carbon fibre chassis, racing brakes and equipment, and a double wishbone suspension on both axles.

Production versions

ZE
The production version of the Zoe was announced in March 2012 at the Geneva Motor Show. Similar to the Zoe Preview of 2010 and the design credited to Jean Semeriva, it is a five-door supermini at 4080 mm long, a little longer than the Renault Clio. Retail customer deliveries began in limited number in France in December 2012, and Renault planned to increase availability during the first quarter of 2013. The first Zoe was delivered to Arnaud Montebourg, French Minister of Industrial Recovery. The Zoe is produced at Flins on the same assembly line as the Renault Clio and Nissan Micra. About 170 Zoes are made per day.

In France the Zoe pricing starts at  before applying the existing  tax incentive, plus a monthly fee for the battery.

The car features a charging system called "Caméléon" (Chameleon) charger that allows the Zoe to be charged at any level of AC power up to 43 kW (63A), taking between 30 minutes and nine hours. The particular type of grid system in parts of Norway with a different potential for the protective ground requires a special charger, which is included with all Zoes in Norway from summer 2015.

In June 2015, Renault announced the introduction of a new, smaller electric motor called the R240, manufactured at its Cléon engine plant. However, the Q210 would still be available as the R240 allowed only 22 kW quick charging.

ZE 40
In October 2016 at the Paris Motor Show, Renault unveiled a 41 kWh lithium-ion battery called the ZE 40, weighing . The battery was developed by Renault and LG Chem, and is assembled at Renault's Flins plant. The Q210 would still be available, renamed as Q90. Older Zoes using the battery would get a less significant range increase because of various design upgrades. Options to buy the battery would be available, along with revised lease plans.

Physically, Renault still uses 192 3.5 volts lithium cells (LG Chem) in 12 modules (16 cells per module) configuration.

ZE 50 
In June 2019 Renault announced a new Zoe with a 52 kWh battery, achieving range of  under WLTP conditions. It comes with either an 80 kW R110 electric motor for the "Iconic" trim level, or a 100 kW R135 electric motor for the "S Edition" and "GT Line +" trim levels. It also comes with faster charging with the option of 50 kW DC capability via CCS2.

Electrics and Drivetrain variants

Battery 

First generation battery:
Thermals: air cooled
Total weight: 290 kg
Total capacity: 25,92 kWh (192 x 36 Ah x 3,75 V = 25,92 kWh)
Available capacity: 23.3 kWh
Cells: 192 cells, each with 36 Ah nominal capacity and 3,75 V nominal voltage.
Total cell weight: 165.12 kg (192 x 0.86 kg = 165.12 kg)
Charging: type 2 (22 kW AC with 3-phase), and 43 kW 3-phase for all initial Zoe before the advent of R240 version
Second generation battery:
Thermals: air cooled
Total weight: 305 kg
Total capacity: 45.61 kWh (estimation by knowing the usable capacity)
Available capacity: 41 kWh
Cells: 192 cells, each with 63.35 Ah nominal capacity (estimation) and 3.75 V nominal voltage
Total cell weight: 180.12 kg (estimation by knowing the total battery weight)
Charging: type 2 (22 kW AC with 3-phase), and 43 kW 3-phase for Q90 variant
Third generation battery:
Thermals: air cooled
Total weight:
Total capacity: 55 kWh
Available capacity: 52 kWh
Cells:
Total cell weight:
Charging: type 2 (22 kW AC with 3-phase) and CCS (50 kW)

In Norway, pricing starts at 229,400 kroner (~ ), and the pricing of the variant with the original 22 kWh battery starts at 40,000 kroner (~ ) less than the 41 kWh variant. The small battery can be upgraded to the newer one, at a cost of around 3500 Euros for rented batteries.

In the UK, it has been possible to buy the Zoe with the battery, or lease the battery. Leasing the battery gives a free replacement if capacity falls under 80%.

Charger 

The 2015 R240 version removed the 43 kW AC charging capability, in exchange for better efficiency of low power home charging. The 2017 facelift still allowed for a Q90 rapid charge option (full-speed 43 kW rapid charging).  A full charge at 22 kW speed will take two hours and 40 minutes, with 80% of the range recovered in an hour and 40 minutes. The Q90, by comparison, takes 65 minutes to reach 80% capacity.

Motor
In February 2018, Renault introduced an updated version of the R90 motor, the R110, which upped power output to  while maintaining the same estimated economy and similar torque. The R90 would still be available for sale. The price for cars equipped with the new motor would be slightly higher than those using the R90 version. The R110 will be the first Renault motor certified under WLTP and sales would start by the end of the 2018 summer in Europe.

In 2019, Renault introduced the R135 motor (100 kW) in the ZE 50.

Safety 
The Zoe received a five-star Euro NCAP 2013-rating. The score was:

In 2021, the updated Zoe in its standard European configuration received a zero-star safety rating, becoming the third car in Euro NCAP's history to record a zero-star rating. The score was:

Sales and markets

Retail customer deliveries began in limited numbers in France in December 2012, and availability was increased during the first quarter of 2013. A total of 48 units were registered in France during December 2012, and cumulative sales reached 5,559 units through December 2013. The Zoe became the top selling all-electric vehicle in the country in January 2013, and kept the monthly lead through December 2013, representing 62.8% of electric car sales in the country during 2013. In addition, the Zoe became the best selling electric car in France accounting for registrations in the electric passenger car segment since 2010 through December 2013.

Deliveries in the UK began in March 2013, and Germany, Italy and Spain in April 2013. Cumulative global sales totaled 8,874 units through December 2013. Out of 8,792 cars sold in Europe through December 2013, 62.7% were sold in France (5,511). Germany was the second top selling market, with 1,019 units delivered through December 2013, followed by the Netherlands with 547 units registered.

The Renault Zoe was officially launched in the Norwegian market in April 2014, though retail deliveries began in late March. Unlike other European countries, the Zoe is sold in Norway with the battery pack included and there are no battery leasing options available. A total of 11,323 Zoes were sold globally in 2014. France continued as the top selling market with cumulative sales of 11,529 units, and the Zoe continued as the all-time best selling electric car in the country, with 5,970 units sold in 2014. Global sales reached the 10,000 unit mark in January 2014, and 25,000 in May 2015. The milestone of 50,000 units produced was reached in April 2016, while sales achieved the 50,000 unit milestone in June 2016.

With a record 10,406 units sold in 2015, the Zoe was again the top selling all-electric car in France, and continued as the best-selling electric car in the country ever. The Zoe, with 18,453 registrations, was the top selling pure electric car in Europe in 2015. The Zoe ranked as the world's 8th best-selling electric car in 2015. , France remained as the Zoe's top country market, with 27,155 units registered since its inception in 2012. Zoe sales in the French market represented 53% of global sales.

The Zoe ranked as the best-selling all-electric car in Europe for the second year in a row in 2016 with 21,735 units delivered, representing 21.2% of the segment sales that year. Also, the Zoe topped European sales in the broader plug-in electric car segment, ahead of the Mitsubishi Outlander P-HEV, the top selling plug-in in the previous two years. In 2016 the Zoe ranked again as the world's 8th best-selling electric car. , the Zoe ranked as the world's all-time eighth best selling plug-in car. 

Global sales totaled 31,932 units in 2017 and 40,517 in 2018. Global sales reached the 150,000 unit milestone in June 2019, and the 200,000th Zoe produced rolled off the Flins plant in November 2019. Annual sales passed the 100,000 unit mark in 2020 for the first time, and the Zoe listed as the best selling plug-in passenger car in Europe in 2020, and by the end of 2020, the Zoe ranked as the all-time best selling plug-in car in Europe.

, the Zoe continued as France's all-time best selling plug-in with more than 100,000 units registered, and has led electric car sales in the French market for seven years running, from 2013 to 2019. Since inception, global sales totaled 284,761 units through December 2020 including both the passenger and cargo variants.

Recognition
The Zoe was one of the top three finalists for the 2013 World Green Car of the Year.

Criticism
Technology blog TechDirt suggested that the Zoe's battery pack could contain Digital Rights Management software, on the grounds that the original battery lease agreements for the Zoe gave Renault the right to prevent the car's battery from charging at end of lease. Following an Electronic Frontier Foundation article which cited TechDirt's supposition to argue that this could render the vehicle unusable if the owner ceases payment or Renault withdraws support, Renault publicly denied any use of DRM technology through its official Twitter account.

Name dispute 
In May 2010, a Parisian woman named Zoe Renault commenced legal action to try to force Renault to rethink their choice of name amid claims it would lead to mocking jibes. In November 2010, a French judge ruled that Renault could use the name.

Upcoming discontinuation 
In 2023, Renault will launch the 5 EV, which will replace the Zoe after being on the market for then 10 years in a single generation.

See also 

 Battery balancing (LBC)
 Government incentives for plug-in electric vehicles
 List of electric cars currently available
 List of modern production plug-in electric vehicles
 List of production battery electric vehicles
 Plug-in electric vehicle
 Renault Twizy
 Renault Z.E.
 Zero-emissions vehicle
 Nissan LEAF

References

External links 
 (UK)
Understanding the different Zoe models: Equipment, Accessories & Interior
 Renault now lets you buy out the battery lease and Renault ZOE battery upgrade conditions.
 Renault Zoe ZE 40 battery details

Production electric cars
Electric city cars
Cars introduced in 2012
2010s cars
Euro NCAP superminis